World Humanitarian Day is an international day dedicated to recognize humanitarian personnel and those who have died working for humanitarian causes.  It was designated by the United Nations General Assembly as part of a Swedish-sponsored GA Resolution A/63/L.49 on the Strengthening of the Coordination of Emergency Assistance of the United Nations, and set as 19 August. It marks the day on which the then Special Representative of the Secretary-General to Iraq, Sérgio Vieira de Mello and 21 of his colleagues were killed in the bombing of the UN Headquarters in Baghdad.

History
The designation of 19 August as World Humanitarian Day is the outcome of the relentless efforts of the Sérgio Vieira de Mello Foundation and his family working closely with the Ambassadors of France, Switzerland, Japan and Brazil in both Geneva and New York to table and steer the draft Resolution through the General Assembly. The Foundation conveyed its deep gratitude to the United Nations General Assembly and all Member States for the worthy gesture of recognition that has ensured that the tragic loss of Vieira de Mello and his 21 colleagues and all humanitarian personnel who have made the ultimate sacrifices in relieving the suffering of victims of humanitarian crises have not been in vain.

A national of Brazil, Sérgio Vieira de Mello dedicated a lifetime spanning over thirty years in the United Nations, serving in some of the most challenging humanitarian situations in the world to reach the voiceless victims of armed conflict, alleviate their suffering and draw attention to their plight. His death together with 21 colleagues on 19 August 2003 in Baghdad, deprived the victims of armed conflict worldwide of a unique humanitarian leader of unmatched courage, drive and empathy who championed their cause fearlessly and etched their plight on the world map. The tragic event also robbed the humanitarian community of an outstanding humanitarian leader and intellectual whose thinking, philosophy, dynamism and courage inspired all and remains a timeless legacy for coming generations to emulate.

Mindful of this legacy, in 2006 the Vieira de Mello family and a group of close friends founded the Sergio Vieira de Mello Foundation dedicated to continue his unfinished mission of encouraging dialogue between communities and relieving the plight of victims of humanitarian crises. The Foundation is dedicated to supporting initiatives and efforts to promote dialogue for peaceful reconciliation and co-existence between peoples and communities divided by conflict through an annual Sergio Vieira Mello Award, an Annual Sergio Vieira Mello Memorial Lecture, a Sergio Vieira de Mello Fellowship and advocating for the security and independence of humanitarian actors, wherever they may be operating and whomever they may be operating for. The Foundation views the World Humanitarian Day as a befitting tribute to all humanitarian personnel who have made the ultimate sacrifices to make the world a better place for all victims of humanitarian crises and an encouragement to all their serving colleagues to aspire to even greater heights in accomplishing that laudable goal.

Commemoration
The Sérgio Vieira de Mello Foundation is committed to working closely with all Governments, the United Nations, International Organizations and Non-Governmental Organizations to give the Word Humanitarian Day a meaningful observance every year. The UN Office for the Coordination of Humanitarian Affairs is leading efforts to plan and guide the observance of the Day that will be commemorated worldwide by Governments, the United Nations and International Humanitarian Organizations and NGOs.

World Humanitarian Day was commemorated for the first time on 19 August 2009. Subsequent years have focused on a particular theme. In 2010, the focus was on the actual work and achievements of humanitarian workers in the field, with the theme, "We are Humanitarian Workers". The 2011 campaign, "People Helping People", was about inspiring the spirit of aid work in everyone. The 2012 campaign, "I Was Here", was about making one's mark by doing something good, somewhere, for someone else. The campaign had a social reach of more than 1 billion people around the world. It was supported by the American singer Beyoncé, whose music video for the song "I Was Here" has been viewed more than 50 million times.

In 2013, the UN and its partners launched the project called "The World Needs More…". In collaboration with global advertising firm Leo Burnett, the campaign aims to turn words into aid for people affected by humanitarian crises. Private sector companies and philanthropists were encouraged to sponsor a word that they believe the world could use more of, e.g. "action".  People could then ‘unlock’ money pledged by sponsors by ‘sharing’ these words through social media, SMS and through the campaign website.

See also
Humanitarianism
Sérgio Vieira de Mello
Canal Hotel bombing
Office for the Coordination of Humanitarian Affairs
International Day of Peace
International Human Solidarity Day
Human Rights Day

References

External links
 World Humanitarian Day
 The Sergio Vieira de Mello Foundation
 The General Assembly of the United Nations

August observances
United Nations days
International observances